Chet Baker in Tokyo is a live album by jazz trumpeter and singer Chet Baker, recorded at Showa Women's University's Hitomi Memorial Hall. Released only eleven months before his death, it has been hailed as, "A glorious moment in Chet Baker's twilight."

Reception 
John Vinocur of The New York Times praised the album, saying:

Rick Anderson of AllMusic said the album "shows him to have still been in complete control of his musical faculties, playing not just beautifully and well, but with energy and even speed despite his deteriorating health."

Track listing 
Source:

Disc one:

 "Stella by Starlight" - 10:50
 "For Minors Only" - 7:40
 "Almost Blue" - 7:53
 "Portrait in Black and White" - 15:46
 "My Funny Valentine" - 13:14

Disc two:

 "Four" - 7:28
 "Arborway" - 14:00
 "I'm A Fool to Want You" - 11:22
 "Seven Steps to Heaven" - 7:56
 "For All We Know" - 8:57
 "Broken Wing" - 10:08

Personnel

Musicians 

 Chet Baker - Vocals, Trumpet
 Harold Danko - Piano
 Hein Van Der Geyn - Bass
 John Engels - Drums

Production 

 Yoichi Nakao - Producer

References

External links 

 Live performance

Chet Baker albums
1987 albums